Miami Township is one of the twelve townships of Hamilton County, Ohio, United States.  The population was 15,969 as of the 2020 census.

Geography
Located in the southwestern corner of the county along the Ohio River, it borders the following townships:
Whitewater Township - north
Colerain Township - northeast
Green Township - east
Delhi Township - southeast
Boone County, Kentucky - south, across the Ohio River.
Lawrenceburg Township, Dearborn County, Indiana - southwest

Four municipalities are located in Miami Township:
A small part of the city of Cincinnati, the county seat of Hamilton County, in the southeast, along the Ohio River above Addyston
The village of Addyston, in the southeast, along the Ohio River between Cincinnati and North Bend
The village of North Bend, in the south, along the Ohio River below Addyston
The village of Cleves, in the center
The census-designated places of Grandview, Miami Heights, Shawnee, and a portion of Mack are located in Miami Township.

Name and history

Statewide, other Miami Townships are located in Clermont, Greene, Logan, and Montgomery counties.

The township was named for its location at the point where the Great Miami River flows into the Ohio River.

The monument and tomb of U.S. President William Henry Harrison is located just off U.S. Route 50 in the township, and his former residence is located in nearby North Bend.

Education
The Township is primarily served by the Three Rivers Local School District, which includes Taylor High School.

Government
The township is governed by a three-member board of trustees, who are elected in November of odd-numbered years to a four-year term beginning on the following January 1. Two are elected in the year after the presidential election and one is elected in the year before it. There is also an elected township fiscal officer, who serves a four-year term beginning on April 1 of the year after the election, which is held in November of the year before the presidential election. Vacancies in the fiscal officership or on the board of trustees are filled by the remaining trustees.

References

External links 
Township website

Townships in Hamilton County, Ohio
Townships in Ohio